Greenland is located between the Arctic Ocean and the North Atlantic Ocean, northeast of Canada and northwest of Iceland. The territory comprises the island of Greenland—the largest island in the world—and more than a hundred other smaller islands (see alphabetic list). Greenland has a 1.2 kilometre (0.75 mi) long border with Canada on Hans Island. A sparse population is confined to small settlements along certain sectors of the coast. Greenland possesses the world's second-largest ice sheet.

Greenland sits atop the Greenland plate, a subplate of the North American plate. The Greenland craton is made up of some of the oldest rocks on the face of the earth. The Isua greenstone belt in southwestern Greenland contains the oldest known rocks on Earth, dated at 3.7–3.8 billion years old.

The vegetation is generally sparse, with the only patch of forested land being found in Nanortalik Municipality in the extreme south near Cape Farewell.

The climate is arctic to subarctic, with cool summers and cold winters. The terrain is mostly a flat but gradually sloping icecap that covers all land except for a narrow, mountainous, barren, rocky coast. The northernmost point of the island of Greenland is Cape Morris Jesup, discovered by Admiral Robert Peary in 1900. Natural resources include zinc, lead, iron ore, coal, molybdenum, gold, platinum, uranium, hydropower and fish.

Area
Total area:
2,166,086 km2

Land area:
2,166,086 km2 (410,449 km2 ice-free, 1,755,637 km2 ice-covered)

Maritime claims:

Territorial sea:

Exclusive fishing zone:

Land use
Arable land:
approximately 6%; some land is used to grow silage.
Permanent crops:
Approximately 0%
Other:
100% (2012 est.)

The total population comprises around 56,000 inhabitants, of whom approximately 18,000 live in the capital, Nuuk.

Natural hazards
Continuous ice sheet covers 84% of the country; the rest is permafrost.

Environment – current issues
Protection of the Arctic environment, climate change, pollution of the food chain, excessive hunting of endangered species (walrus, polar bears, narwhal, beluga whale and several sea birds).

Climate

Greenland's climate is a tundra climate on and near the coasts and an ice cap climate in inland areas. It typically has short, cool summers and long, moderately cold winters.

Due to Gulf Stream influences, Greenland's winter temperatures are very mild for its latitude. In Nuuk, the capital, average winter temperatures are only . This is too low to sustain trees, and the land is treeless tundra.

On the Greenland ice sheet, the temperature is far below freezing throughout the year, and record high temperatures have peaked only slightly above freezing.

In the far south of Greenland, there is a very small forest in the Qinngua Valley, due to summer temperatures being barely high enough to sustain trees.

Climate change 
The ice is so massive that its weight presses the bedrock of Greenland below sea level and is so all-concealing that not until recently did scientists discover Greenland's Grand Canyon or the possibility that Greenland might actually be three islands.

If the ice melted, the interior bedrock below sea level would be covered by water. It is not clear whether this water would be at sea level or a lake above sea level. If it would be at sea level it could connect to the sea at Ilulissat Icefjord, in Baffin Bay and near Nordostrundingen, creating three large islands. But it is most likely that it would be a lake with one drain.

It is thought that before the last Ice Age, Greenland had mountainous edges and a lowland (and probably very dry) center which drained to the sea via one big river flowing out westwards, past where Disko Island is now.

There is concern about sea level rise caused by ice loss (melt and glaciers falling into the sea) on Greenland. Half of the increase was from higher summer melting, with the rest caused by the movements of some glaciers exceeding the speeds needed to balance upstream snow accumulation.

Researchers at NASA's Jet Propulsion Laboratory and the University of Kansas reported in February 2006 that the glaciers are melting twice as fast as they were five years ago. The increased ice loss may be partially offset by increased snow accumulation due to increased precipitation.

Between 1991 and 2006, monitoring of the weather at one location (Swiss Camp) found that the average winter temperature had risen almost .

Recently, Greenland's three largest outlet glaciers have started moving faster, satellite data show. These are the Jakobshavn Isbræ at Ilulissat on the western edge of Greenland, and the Kangerdlugssuaq and Helheim glaciers on the eastern edge of Greenland. The two latter accelerated greatly during the years 2004–2005, but returned to pre-2004 velocities in 2006. The accelerating ice flow has been accompanied by a dramatic increase in seismic activity. In March 2006, researchers at Harvard University and the Lamont–Doherty Earth Observatory at Columbia University reported that the glaciers now generate swarms of earthquakes up to magnitude 5.0.

The retreat of Greenland's ice is revealing islands that were thought to be part of the mainland.

Future projections 
In the Arctic, temperatures are rising faster than anywhere else in the world. Greenland is losing 200 billion tonnes of ice per year. Research suggests that this could increase the sea levels' rise by 30 centimeters by the end of the century. These projections have the possibility of changing as satellite data only dates back to 40 years ago. This means that researchers must view old photographs of glaciers and compare them to ones taken today to determine the future of Greenland's ice.

Temperature extremes

Highest temperatures

Lowest temperatures

Topography 
The ice sheet covering Greenland varies significantly in elevation across the landmass, rising dramatically between the coastline at sea level and the East-Central interior, where elevations reach . The coastlines are rocky and predominantly barren with fjords. Numerous small islands spread from the Central to Southern coastlines.

Greenland's mountain ranges are partially or completely buried by ice. The highest mountains are in the Watkins Range, which runs along the eastern coast.

Scientists discovered an asteroid impact crater in the northwestern region of Greenland, buried underneath the ice sheet. At a size larger than Washington, D.C., it is the first impact crater found beneath one of Earth's ice sheets.

Extreme points
This is a list of the extreme points of Greenland, the points that are farther north, south, east or west than any other location.

Territory of Greenland

 Northernmost point — Kaffeklubben Island (83°40'N) – the northernmost permanent land in the world. There are also some shifting gravel bars that lie north of Kaffeklubben, the most northerly ever found being 83-42.
 Southernmost point — unnamed islet 2.3 km south of Cape Farewell, Egger Island (59°44'N)
 Westernmost point — Nordvestø, Carey Islands (73°10'W)
 Easternmost point — Nordostrundingen, Greenland (11°19'W)
 Highest point — Gunnbjørn Fjeld,

Mainland Greenland

 Northernmost point — Cape Morris Jesup (83°39'N)
 Southernmost point — Peninsula near Tasiusaq, Kujalleq (59°58'26.4"N)
 Westernmost point — Cape Alexander (73°08'W)
 Easternmost point — Nordostrundingen, Greenland (11°19'W)
 Highest point — Gunnbjørn Fjeld, .

Towns 
Greenland has 17 towns – settlements with more than 500 inhabitants. Nuuk is the largest town – and the capital – with roughly one third of the country's urban population. Sisimiut with approximately 5,500 inhabitants is the second largest town, while Ilulissat is number three with around 5,000 inhabitants.

 Aasiaat
 Ilulissat
 Ittoqqortoormiit
 Kangaatsiaq
 Maniitsoq
 Nanortalik
 Narsaq
 Nuuk
 Paamiut
 Qaanaaq
 Qaqortoq
 Qasigiannguit
 Qeqertarsuaq
 Sisimiut
 Tasiilaq
 Upernavik
 Uummannaq

History of exploration

Gallery

See also
List of mountain peaks of Greenland
List of mountain ranges of Greenland
Greenland's Grand Canyon
Climate change adaptation in Greenland

References

External links

 www.geus.dk Geological map of Greenland from the Geological Survey of Denmark and Greenland (GEUS).
 "Times Atlas reviews Greenland map accuracy after climate change row" – The Guardian, 22 September 2011